Monte Croce di Muggio is a mountain of Lombardy in Italy with an elevation of . It is located near Lake Como, close to the city of Bellano.

Mountains of the Alps
Mountains of Lombardy